John Alexander Hill (February 22, 1858 – January 24, 1916) was a co-founder of the McGraw-Hill Book Company, the predecessor corporation of today's McGraw Hill Financial and McGraw-Hill Education. He was born in Sandgate, Vermont on Feb. 22, 1858.

In the 1880s, prior to entering the publishing business, he owned and operated machine shops and worked as a railroad engineer. Beginning in 1888, Hill worked as an editor at Locomotive Engineer, and over the next few years he would produce several technical and trade publications. In 1896, he became president of the American Machinist Press.

He formed his own company, The Hill Publishing Company, in 1902. From 1900 to 1902 he served as mechanical engineer for the General Manifold Company, custom-designing machinery. As head of Hill Publishing, he printed five weekly magazines: American Machinist, Power, Engineering News, The Engineering and Mining Journal, and Coal Age.

Hill had known James H. McGraw, who had established The McGraw Publishing Company in 1899, for some time, and the two men shared similar interests. In 1909 they agreed upon an alliance and combined the book departments of their publishing companies into The McGraw-Hill Book Company. Hill served as president of this combined company from 1909 to 1916, the year he died unexpectedly of a heart condition.

The following year, the remaining parts of Hill's company merged with McGraw's to form The McGraw-Hill Publishing Company, which later became The McGraw-Hill Companies.

References

External links
 
 
 

American publishers (people)
American editors
1916 deaths
1858 births
American company founders
McGraw-Hill books
American railroad mechanical engineers
19th-century American businesspeople
19th-century American engineers